Maxim Albertovich Amelin (born 7 January 1970) is a Russian poet, critic, essayist, editor, and translator. He was born in Kursk, Russia, where he graduated from the Kursk Commercial College (Курский торговый техникум) and did his military service in the Soviet Army. He was commercial director and director of the St. Petersburg publishing house  from 1995 to 2007 and has been the Editor-in-Chief of the Moscow publishing house OGI since 2008. He is married to the poet  and lives in Moscow.

Tatyana Bek was the first to define his style, calling him an "archaist-innovator." His poetry is influenced by classical Greek and Roman poetry and by Russian poetry of the 18th century. He has translated the works of Catullus, Pindar, and Homer, as well as poetry from Georgian, Italian, Ukrainian, and other languages.  

Poetry (in Russian) 

 (Cold Odes) Холодные оды — М.: Symposium, 1996.
 Dubia — СПб.: Ина-Пресс, 1999. 
 (The Horse of the Gorgon) Конь Горгоны — М.: Время, 2003. 
 (Bent Speech) Гнутая речь — М.: Б. С. Г.-Пресс, 2011. 
 (The Joyous Science, or The True Story of the Famous Bruce, Composed in Verse from the Accounts of Several Eyewitnesses) Веселая наука, или Подлинная повесть о знаменитом Брюсе, переложенная стихами со слов нескольких очевидцев — М.: Август, 2018.

Poetry Collections (translated) 

 Maksim Ameljin. Gorgonin konj / Prijevod s ruskog i bilješke Žarko Milenić. Brčko: Kniževny klub, 2012.  
 Maxim Amelin. Arkadentempel. Gedichte / Übersetzt von Alexander Nitzberg. Vienna: Klever Verlag, 2013.  
 Maxim Amelin & Irina Iermakova. Esperit i fang / Edició a cura Nuria Busquet & Ricard San Vicente. Barcelona: Institució de les Lletres Catalanes, 2015.  
 Maxim Amelin. The Joyous Science: Selected Poems of Maxim Amelin. Translated by Derek Mong and Anne O. Fisher. Buffalo: White Pine Press, 2018.

Translations by Maxim Amelin 

 (Catullus. Selected lyrics.) Катулл. Избранная лирика / Перевод, примечания. — СПб.: Алетейя, 1997; 2-е изд., 1999.
 (Carmina Priapea.) «Приапова книга» / Статья, перевод, примечания. — М.; СПб.: Летний сад, 2003.
 (Catullus. Poems.) Катулл. Стихотворения / Статья, перевод, примечания. — М.: Текст, 2010.

Edited anthologies (in Russian) 

 (Nine Dimensions. An Anthology of Contemporary Russian Poetry) Девять измерений. Антология новейшей русской поэзии. / Сост.: Б. Кенжеев, М. Амелин, П. Барскова, С. Тимофеев, Д. Воденников, Д. Давыдов, Д. Кузьмин, К. Маренникова, М. Маурицио, И. Кукулин. — М.: Новое литературное обозрение, 2004.
 (The Best Poems of 2010) Лучшие стихи 2010 года. Поэтическая антология / Составитель и автор. — М.: ОГИ, 2012
 (An Anthology of New Georgian Poetry) Антология новой грузинской поэзии / Сосоставитель и переводчик. — М.: ОГИ, 2014
 (Contemporary Literature of the Peoples of Russia. Poetry [in 57 languages]) Современная литература народов России. Поэзия [на 57 языках] / Ответственный редактор и переводчик. — М.: ОГИ, 2017

Honors and awards 

 The Poet Prize (2017) - "[Amelin] is an archaist-innovator who has given new voice to forgotten Russian poets of the 18th and early 19th centuries, not to mention Catullus, Homer, and Pindar."
 The Novy Mir Prize (1998, 2015) 
 The Solzhenitsyn Prize (2013) — “for innovative experimentation that has expanded the limits and possibilities of lyric poetry, for cultivating the diverse traditions of Russian poetry, and for extensive educational efforts to promote belles-lettres”
 The Moscow Reckoning Special Prize (2012)
 The Bunin Prize (2012)
 The Znamya Prize (2010) 
 The Moscow Reckoning Grand Prize (2004)
 The Antibooker (1998)

References

External links 
 Maxim Amelin's page in Журнальный зал (The Magazine Room) (In Russian) 
 Maxim Amelin's author page in Znamya (In Russian) 
 Maxim Amelin bio on the Read Russia website (in English)
 Interview with Maxim Amelin (in English)

1970 births
Living people
Writers from Kursk
20th-century Russian poets
21st-century Russian poets
Russian literary critics
Russian publishers (people)
20th-century publishers (people)
21st-century publishers (people)
Solzhenitsyn Prize winners